Shin Bong-sun (born October 6, 1980) is a South Korean comedienne and entertainer. She took a five-year hiatus from comedy from 2010 to 2015, which ended when she joined Comedy Big League. She is currently a member of the South Korean girl group Celeb Five.

Television series
 MasterChef Korea Celebrity
 Happy Together Season 3
 Heroes
 Family Outing 2
 Infinite Girls
 Secret
 Exploration of Genders
 BIGsTORY
 Gold Miss is Coming
 Change
 Gag Concert
 Answer Me 1997
 Kim Jung-eun's Chocolate
 The Thousandth Man (cameo)
 King of Mask Singer (fixed panelist, contestant ep 87)
 Idol Maid
 Sweet Revenge 2 (cameo)
  Blindly Commerce (2021,Host)
 Song-eun's Manga Comeback  tvN D Studio (STUDIO) with Song Eun-i
 Goal Girls ( Cast Member , 2021) 
 Goal Girls 2 ( Cast Member, 2021)
 Marriage Is Crazy (2021) - Host 
 Curling Queens (2022) - Host / MBC Lunar New Year special pilot
 Chart Sisters (2022) ; Host with  Celeb Five Member
 Groom's Class (2022); Cast

Web shows

Radio shows

Awards and nominations

References 

1980 births
Living people
South Korean women comedians
South Korean television presenters
South Korean women television presenters
South Korean radio presenters
People from Busan
Gag Concert
South Korean women radio presenters
Best Variety Performer Female Paeksang Arts Award (television) winners